Siue Moffat (born September 5, 1973) is a chocolatier,  cookbook author, filmmaker, zine maker, video activist and film archivist. She was very involved in the punk community (DIY ethic)- doing volunteer administrative work on the "Book Your Own Fucking Life" site (a free online resource for independent artists and promoters, once a hard copy zine published by Maximumrocknroll), and wrote columns about archiving media in the deceased magazine HeartattaCk. A longtime vegan, Siue published one of the first vegan dessert cookbooks in 2003. She also started the first vegan chocolate company in Canada - Boardwalk Chocolates.

Bibliography 
 Fascinating Folks #1 (2012) with Antoine (Pumpkin Pie Press)
 The Day I Stopped Being Punk (2011) with illustrations by Antoine (Pumpkin Pie Press)
 Lickin' the Beaters 2: Vegan Chocolate and Candy, PM Press (2010) 
 Lickin' the Beaters: Low Fat Vegan Desserts Illustrated by 8 Fantastic Artists (Mr. Pither Cycling Tour Concoctions, 2003) , 2008 Reprint PM Press 
 Punk is Like a Box of Candy (2003)
 Gross Food (2003)
 Sick Punks (2001)
 Marcie's Book of Vegan Recipes for Non Picky People #2 (1998)
 Marcie's Book of Vegan Recipes for Non Picky People #1 (1996)
 Punk Rock Film Guide (1996)

Filmography 
Rotchester (2017)
 Niagara.Falls (2017)
 Totally Kid Carousel (2006/2009)
 The End of The Year (Directed by Ben Kukkee, 2005. Sound recordist and sound editor)
 Grilled Cheese Sandwich (Directed by Jonathan Culp, 2005. Sound recordist, stills, etc.)
 Train to New York (2003)
 Become the Media (2003)
 P-Grrrl (2002)
 Patti Helps Out (2002)
 Various films with the Toronto Video Activist Collective (1998-2003)

Other 

 Book indexer for AK Press, Between the Lines, etc. (present)
 Vegan chocolatier/owner Boardwalk Chocolates (2008-2012)
 Presenter and Panelist on "Archiving the Action" at the 2005 Association of Moving Image Archivists Conference in Austin TX
 Guest on CBC's Here And Now 28/8/03
 Print Trafficker for the True/False documentary film festival in Columbia, Missouri (2005-2007)
 Microcosm Publishing worker (2005-2006)
 Volunteer on Oregon Historical Society's film collection  (2005-2007)
 Distribution coordinator in Satan Macnuggit Popular Arts, an activist/DIY film producer and distributor (1999-2003)

References

1973 births
21st-century Canadian women writers
21st-century Canadian non-fiction writers
Living people
Canadian food writers
Canadian film directors
Canadian veganism activists
Canadian women film directors
Canadian women non-fiction writers
Vegan cookbook writers
Women food writers
Women cookbook writers